Lorena Enríquez (born February 22, 1980) is a Mexican actress and hostess. She recently featured in the Mexican soap opera Un Gancho al Corazón.

Career

Theater 
La Sirenita Role: Ariel
Blanca Nieves y los 7 enanos Role: Blanca Nieves
Aladino y la lámpara maravillosa Role: Princesa Jazmín
El rey león Role: Fairy tale elf
Peter Pan Role: narrator
Una navidad con Mickey Role: Elf
Un cuento de navidad Role: Mildred
Magia y misterio Role: Arcana
Todo quedó en familia Role: Laura
No puedo Role: Silvana
Las preciosas ridículas (Molière) Role: Madelon
El zoo de cristal (Tennessee Williams). Role: Laura Wingfield

Television

Telenovelas (soap operas) 
Como dice el dicho (2013). Role: Celia
Llena de Amor (2010). Role: Doris
Un gancho al corazón (2008–2009). Role: Paula
Pasión (2008). Role: Conchita (special appearance)
Amor sin maquillaje (2007). Role: Berta. Estelar
Apuesta por un amor (2005). Role: Soledad
Velo de novia (2003). Role: Inés
El manantial (2001–2002). Role: Maru
El precio de tu amor (2000). Role: Columba
Serafín (1999). Role: Martha
Te sigo amando (1996–1997). Role: Consuelito
Mujer, casos de la vida real
Diseñador ambos sexos
La jaula

Films
Mujeres infieles. Role: ???

External links
 

1980 births
Actresses from Mexico City
Mexican film actresses
Mexican stage actresses
Mexican telenovela actresses
Living people